The Wright Electrocity was a type of hybrid electric bus built by Wrightbus between 2002 and 2013. The Electrocity was based on DAF/VDL SB120 chassis for most of these buses, except for a single Dennis Dart SLF prototype.

History
Two Electrocity prototypes were initially built in 2002; one based on DAF SB120 chassis, the other based on a Dennis Dart SLF chassis. The bodywork design was similar to the existing Wright Cadet and Crusader, which were also built on DAF SB120 and Dennis Dart SLF chassis respectively, with the addition of battery pods on the roof of the Electrocity being the main difference. The Electrocity was the first bus of its kind to be built, and the prototypes competed mainly with the TransBus Enviro200H.

The Electrocity design was facelifted in 2005 to match the updated Cadet design, with the main noticeable change being rounded front headlights. Following the collapse of TransBus International in 2004 and subsequent cancellation of the Enviro200H programme, in February 2006 London Central placed six Electrocitys based on VDL SB120 chassis into service on route 360.

Originally equipped with lead-acid batteries and 1.9 litre Vauxhall engines, in 2011 all were rebuilt by Wrightbus with  lithium-ion batteries and 4.5 litre Cummins ISBe engines. The hybrid management system was converted from Enova to Siemens. Externally they received larger white pods on the rear roofs to house the batteries. 

All subsequent Electrocitys were built on VDL SB120 chassis. In 2007, another five were built for Travel London for use on route 129. A single Electrocity was built for London Central in 2008, followed by a batch of six in 2011, to allow for a full conversion of route 360.

These were the last buses to be built to the same Wrightbus design philosophy as that introduced with the Wright Renown in 1997, fourteen years previously; the similarity in the design of the Renown and the Electrocity, at least on the surface with the body design, is evident.

The Electrocity was superseded by the Wright StreetAir in 2016.

References

External links

Wrightbus Electrocity Wrightbus

Hybrid electric buses
Low-entry buses
Vehicles introduced in 2002
Electrocity